Wei Qiuyue (born 26 September 1988) is a retired Chinese volleyball player. She was the captain of China women's national volleyball team between 2008-2012.

Career
She was part of the bronze medal winning teams at the 2008 Beijing Olympic Games and the silver medal winning teams at the 2007 World Grand Prix.

She won the 2010 Montreux Volley Masters with her national team, being awarded "Best Setter".

She was named Best Setter at the 2010 World Championship.

After a disappointed fifth place at the 2012 Summer Olympics, in 2013 she took a year off from the national team to repair her knee.  She also signed with Igtisadchi Baku in 2013-2014 season, along with her former teammates Ma Yunwen and Zhang Lei.  This was the first time she played for a club other than Tianjin.

In 2014, she was recalled to the national team by Jenny Lang Ping and gained a starting position for the national team which she helped to win the silver medal at the 2014 World Championship. After successful season with the national team, she took some time off from the domestic league and went to the United States to repair her sore knees which has been affected her for a long time with help from Jenny Lang Ping. She came back to the national team in 2015 and was a part of the Chinese team that won gold at the 2015 World Cup.

In 2016, Wei participated at the Summer Olympics where her team won gold by beating Serbia 3-1 in the final and announce her retirement from the national team right away in CCTV5 after the awarding ceremony.

After the 13th Chinese National Games in 2017, Wei announced her retirement as a professional volleyball player.

Clubs
  Tianjin Bridgestone (2003–2013)
  Igtisadchi Baku (2013–2014)
  Tianjin Bridgestone (2014–2017)

Individual awards
 2007 Montreux Volley Masters "Best Setter"
 2007 FIVB World Grand Prix "Best Setter"
 2008 Asian Cup Championship "Most Valuable Player"
 2010 Montreux Volley Masters "Best Setter"
 2010 FIVB Women's World Championship "Best Setter"
 2011 Asian Women's Volleyball Championship "Best Server"

See also
China at the 2012 Summer Olympics#Volleyball
Volleyball at the 2012 Summer Olympics – Women's tournament

References

External links
 FIVB profile
 Olympic Games profile (2008teamchina.olympic.cn)
 

1988 births
Living people
Volleyball players from Tianjin
Chinese women's volleyball players
Olympic gold medalists for China in volleyball
Olympic bronze medalists for China
Volleyball players at the 2008 Summer Olympics
Volleyball players at the 2012 Summer Olympics
Volleyball players at the 2016 Summer Olympics
2016 Olympic gold medalists for China
Medalists at the 2008 Summer Olympics
Asian Games gold medalists for China
Asian Games medalists in volleyball
Volleyball players at the 2010 Asian Games
Igtisadchi Baku volleyball players
Medalists at the 2010 Asian Games
Setters (volleyball)
Chinese expatriate sportspeople
Chinese expatriate sportspeople in Azerbaijan
Expatriate volleyball players in Azerbaijan